Wantan is:
 an alternative spelling for wonton, a Chinese dumpling
 an alternative common name for black mulga, an Australian tree

China 
 Wantan, Henan (万滩镇), town in Zhongmu County
 Wantan, Wufeng County (湾潭镇), town in Hubei
 Wantan Township (湾潭乡), Hanchuan, Hubei